Hans Eberhard Apel (25 February 1932 – 6 September 2011) was a German politician and a member of the Social Democratic Party (SPD). From 1972 to 1974 he was Parliamentary State Secretary to the Foreign Minister. From 1974 to 1978 he was the Minister of Finance and from 1978 to 1982 he was the Minister of Defence.

Education and career 
After completing his Abitur (roughly equivalent to graduating high school, A-Level exam) in 1954 in Hamburg, Apel served an apprenticeship as an import and export businessman, in Hamburg. After completing his apprenticeship, Apel went to university, where he studied economics. In 1960, he was awarded a doctorate in Political Science. From 1958 to 1961, he was the Secretary of the Socialist Group in the European Parliament.

In 1962, Apel became a civil servant at the European Parliament, where he served as Department Head responsible for Economics, Finance and Transport. In 1993, he was appointed an honorary professor of Economics at the University of Rostock.

Family 

Hans and Ingrid Apel married in 1956; they had two daughters.

Politics 
Apel joined the SPD in 1955. From 1970 to 1988, he was a member of the National Executive (Bundesvorstand) of the SPD, and from 1986 to 1988 he was also a member of the Executive Board (Präsidium).
From 1965 to 1990, Apel was a member of the German Bundestag, representing Hamburg-Nord. In 1969, he was deputy chairman of the SPD parliamentary group and again in 1983, after the new elections, until 1988.

Government positions 

In 1972, Apel was appointed Parliamentary State Secretary for European Questions at the German Foreign Office. In 1974, he was appointed Finance Minister in the government of Helmut Schmidt. After the cabinet reshuffle of 1978, he was put in charge of the Ministry of Defense.

He left government on 1 October 1982, after Helmut Kohl became Chancellor. In 1985, Apel ran as the top candidate for the SPD in Berlin, which implied standing as Mayor of Berlin, but lost to the CDU  candidate Eberhard Diepgen.

Religion 
Apel spent his later years speaking about religion. In 2004, he was awarded the Walter Künneth Prize by the "Kirchliche Sammlung um Bibel und Bekenntnis in Bayern" (the Ecclesiastical Assembly for the Bible and Commitment in Bavaria), a conservative Lutheran organization. The prize, named after the German theologian, Walter Künneth, was awarded principally for Apel's book Volkskirche ohne Volk (People's Church without a People), in which he criticizes the "rampant modernism" of the Evangelical Church; he left the North Elbian Evangelical Church and joined the Independent Evangelical-Lutheran Church.

See also 
 List of German finance ministers

References

External links 

  Information on Apel from the German Ministry of Defense (English)
 Interview with Hans Apel at the Historical Archives of the EU in Florence

1932 births
2011 deaths
Finance ministers of Germany
Defence ministers of Germany
Members of the Bundestag for Hamburg
Members of the Bundestag 1987–1990
Members of the Bundestag 1983–1987
Members of the Bundestag 1980–1983
Members of the Bundestag 1976–1980
Members of the Bundestag 1972–1976
Members of the Bundestag 1969–1972
Members of the Bundestag 1965–1969
Academic staff of the University of Rostock
Members of the Bundestag for the Social Democratic Party of Germany
Parliamentary State Secretaries of Germany